The Midnight Stage is a 1919 silent film western directed by Ernest C. Warde and starring Frank Keenan. It was distributed by the Pathé Exchange company.

Cast
 Frank Keenan as John Lynch/Bige Rivers
 Mignon Anderson as Mary Lynch
 Charles Gunn as Harvey James
 Maude George as Nita
 Ernest C. Warde as 'Rat' McGrough
 Dick La Reno as Boggs (* Richard La Reno)
 Arthur Allardt as Pasquale
 Tom Guise as Elias Lynch (* Thomas Guise)
 Joseph J. Dowling as Twisted Tuttle
 Wadsworth Harris as Joe Statler

Preservation status
This film is preserved in the Cinematheque Francais.

References

External links
 
 

1919 films
1919 Western (genre) films
American black-and-white films
Films directed by Ernest C. Warde
Pathé Exchange films
Silent American Western (genre) films
1910s American films
1910s English-language films